"Body Language" is a song by American hip hop recording artist Kid Ink. The song was released on September 9, 2014 by Tha Alumni Music Group, 88 Classic and RCA Records, as the lead single from his third studio album Full Speed (2015).

The song, produced by Cashmere Cat and melody created by Stargate, features a hook performed by American singer Usher and vocals by American singer Tinashe.

Music video
The accompanying music video for the track was directed by Darren Craig and filmed in Atlanta, Georgia. It was released on October 27, 2014.

Charts

Certifications

References

External links
Full lyrics at LyricsOnDemand.com 

2014 singles
2014 songs
Kid Ink songs
Usher (musician) songs
RCA Records singles
Song recordings produced by Cashmere Cat
Song recordings produced by Stargate (record producers)
Tinashe songs
Songs written by Mikkel Storleer Eriksen
Songs written by Tor Erik Hermansen
Songs written by Tinashe
Songs written by Kid Ink
Songs written by Cashmere Cat